The Hellion is a 1924 American silent Western film written and directed for Sunset Productions by Bruce M. Mitchell, and featuring a young Boris Karloff. The film was also released under the title A Woman Scorned. The film's status today is unknown.

Plot
Ranch hand Tex Gardy (J.B. Warner) comes to the aid of the father (William A. Berke) of the girl he loves (Aline Goodwin). The old man's ranch is being threatened by an outlaw gang led by a woman known only as The Hellion (played by Marin Sais).

Cast
 J.B. Warner as Tex Gardy
 Marin Sais as The Hellion
 William A. Berke as The Father (credited as William Lester)
 Aline Goodwin as The Daughter
 Boris Karloff as an Outlaw

See also
 Boris Karloff filmography

References

External links
 
 

1924 films
1924 Western (genre) films
American black-and-white films
Silent American Western (genre) films
Films directed by Bruce M. Mitchell
1920s American films
1920s English-language films